Lágrima (Teardrop) is a romantic prelude for solo guitar by Spanish guitarist Francisco Tárrega. It is one of the best-known original compositions by Tárrega. It has been published by Ildefonso Alier.

Analysis 

Lágrima is a very short miniature consisting of only 16 bars. It takes around 2 minutes to perform and its tempo marking is andante. It has an A-B-A structure, section A being in E major and B in E minor, and has been overwhelmingly highlighted by critics because of its simplicity and melancholic atmosphere. Each section has 8 bars. Section A consists of a very simple and predictable melody with quarter notes and dotted half notes, while the accompaniment has eighth notes. Section B turns a little bit less predictable but otherwise still very simple, with eighth notes on the main voice. At the end of section B, section A is repeated to close the work. As usual in Tárrega's composition, Lágrima bears some technical difficulties in spite of its simplicity.

Composed between late 1891 and early 1892, it is one of Tárrega's most performed pieces. Lágrima has not been included in a definitive catalogue of his works. It has been, however, included in other collections of pieces and has been numbered depending on the position in those collections or in recordings.

Notable recordings 

The following is a list of notable performances of this composition:

See also
List of compositions by Francisco Tárrega

References

External links 
 SMAA YouTube Video Archive (rare 3rd part)
 

Compositions by Francisco Tárrega